Emma McCune (3 February 1964 – 24 November 1993) was an expatriate British foreign aid worker in Sudan who married then-guerrilla leader Riek Machar. She was killed when hit by a matatu in Kenya whilst expecting her first child.

Biography
McCune was born in Assam, India where her father ran a tea plantation. The family returned to the UK but her father did not adjust to life in England. Her parents divorced and her father committed suicide. She attended the School of Oriental and African Studies at the University of London.

In 1985 Emma flew to Australia and back in a single-engined light aircraft with her friend Bill Hall.

Sudan

McCune went to war-torn Sudan in 1987 at age 23 to teach for the British organisation Volunteer Services Overseas. After reluctantly returning to England in 1988 McCune once again returned to Sudan in 1989 to work for the UNICEF-funded Canadian organisation Street Kids International, which founded or re-opened more than 100 village schools in the country's south. McCune spent much of the late 1980s in the south in the midst of war and famine.

Riek Machar
McCune met and married Riek Machar, one of two leading southern guerrilla commanders, and became a high-profile khawagiyya (foreigner). They were instantly attracted to one another, and Machar, who already had a wife, proposed on their second meeting a year after the first. After taking up with Machar, including using a UN-supplied typewriter to produce manifestos, she was fired by Street Kids International. She lived with Machar as war intensified and he split his faction away from the larger movement. At one point they fled a machine-gun attack. In 1993, after becoming pregnant, she moved to Nairobi; she and her unborn child died in a car crash in Nairobi, Kenya.

Publications
Emma's mother, Maggie McCune, published her story in Till the Sun Grows Cold.

Journalist Deborah Scroggins wrote an unauthorised biography of her, Emma's War. "In my heart, I'm Sudanese," she once said, according to Scroggins. Scroggins' depiction of the young British aid worker is complicated and often critical.  McCune is depicted as a woman willing to bravely confront military warlords for help allowing Sudanese children to be schooled in their villages but later, after marrying that same warlord, is able to deny to herself the corruption and horrific violence resulting from her husband's civil war struggle.

The book had been optioned for a film to be directed by Tony Scott, but the family objected to a film based on the book, delaying its production. The film was still in development at the time of Scott's death in 2012; its fate remains unclear.

Legacy
Emma also saved more than 150 war children in Sudan including hip hop artist Emmanuel Jal and is the title subject of his song "Emma McCune" on his 2008 album Warchild.

References

External links
Out of her depth – review of Emma's War
Emma's War – review at Salon.com
Emma's War – official book site

1964 births
1993 deaths
Road incident deaths in Kenya
British expatriates in Sudan
British activists
Sudanese educators
Alumni of SOAS University of London